"Morton's Fork" is the tenth and final episode of the first season of the FX anthology series Fargo. The episode aired on June 17, 2014 in the United States on FX. It was written by series creator and showrunner Noah Hawley and directed by Matt Shakman. The title refers to a dilemma of the same name, posed in the episode by FBI agents Pepper (Keegan-Michael Key) and Budge (Jordan Peele).

As each season of Fargo follows a different story and characters, the season finale is the conclusion of all storylines developed thus far. In "Morton's Fork", Lester Nygaard (Martin Freeman) desperately tries to escape Lorne Malvo (Billy Bob Thornton), who is hunting him, while also trying to stop the police and Deputy Molly Solverson (Allison Tolman) from uncovering his involvement in murders past and present.

The episode was acclaimed by critics, and was seen by 1.98 million viewers.

Plot
The episode opens up showing the aftermath of a snowmobile crash. From the snowmobile, a trail of footprints are seen in the snow leading to a hole in the frozen lake.

Back in the parking lot outside Lester Nygaard's workplace, Lester watches as Lorne Malvo exits the building after having killed his second wife Linda. Once Lorne leaves the scene, Lester goes into the office in order to get the money from the safe. Before leaving, he covers up the crime scene in order to make it look like he was never there.

Lester enters Lou's diner, telling Lou that Linda went to his office and should arrive soon. Lester indicates that he is going to the bathroom but instead leaves the diner through the back door. Outside, Lester enters a phone booth and makes an anonymous call to Bemidji's police station to report shots being fired at an intersection near Lester's office, before sneaking back through into the diner. Speaking with Lester, Lou recalls his conversation with "a fella" (Malvo) who was looking for Lester. As police cars rush past the diner, Lester realizes that he had left the airplane tickets to Acapulco in the jacket he gave to Linda before she went into the office.

At home, Molly Solverson receives word that another of Lester's wives has been murdered. Molly goes to the crime scene where she meets Lester. Lester tries but fails to retrieve the tickets from the jacket. The police bring Lester back to the station, where he refuses to answer any questions. Lester is allowed to return home the next morning, but must be accompanied by FBI agents Pepper and Budge.

Malvo goes to a used car lot and chats up one of the salesmen (the same young husband that Lester failed to sell life insurance to a year earlier) about one car that resembles an undercover police car, convincing him to allow the two to go for a test drive. Malvo later sees Lester being taken home by the FBI agents, and follows in his own car. During his trip home, Lester is asked about and solves the riddle of the fox, the rabbit and the cabbage. Once they return Lester home, the two FBI agents remain outside. Forced by Malvo, the salesman drives his car up to Lester's house, attracting the attention of the agents; Malvo takes advantage of their distraction to murder both of them. The driver begs to be let go (“I have a little girl.”).

Lester peers out the window and sees a trail of blood, which leads to the pile of logs where Malvo has disposed of the bodies, and runs upstairs to hide. Malvo enters Lester's house, and follows Lester’s voice to his bedroom. Malvo's foot is caught in a bear trap left by Lester hidden underneath a pile of clothing on the floor. They fire at each other, but it appears they both miss. Malvo strikes Lester in the face with Lester's award, bloodying his face and mirroring the injury inflicted on Lester by Sam Hess a year earlier. Lester's gun jams, and Malvo escapes severely injured. Lester runs outside, following Malvo’s trail of blood, and both cars are gone (suggesting that the car salesman was allowed to escape).

Malvo retreats to his cabin to treat his injury, not knowing that Grimly has already found it. Grimly tells Malvo that he has solved his riddle posed a year earlier and kills the unarmed Malvo by shooting him five times. When the police arrive, they find Malvo's trove of audiotapes, including the one containing Lester's confession to the murder of his first wife.

Two weeks later, Lester, now the subject of a manhunt after his murder of Pearl has been revealed, is shown on a snowmobile in Glacier National Park in Montana. Lester is recognized by law enforcement officers and tries to escape, only to crash his snowmobile. Desperate, he continues on foot, only to fall through the thin ice, meeting his end, and revealing that the scene shown at the beginning of the episode depicted Lester's fate.

At home, Molly receives the news of Lester. Gus tells her that he's receiving a citation for bravery, but he feels that she deserves it. Molly reassures her husband that this is his moment.

Production
The episode's score features the Norwegian folk song "The Lost Sheep" ("Den bortkomne sauen" in Norwegian), which was the main theme of the original film.

Reception

Ratings
The episode was first aired in the US on FX on June 17, 2014 and obtained 1.98 million viewers.

Critical reception
The episode was acclaimed by critics. It currently holds a perfect 100% rating on Rotten Tomatoes.

The A.V. Club writers Zack Handlen and Emily VanDerWerff gave the episode a B+ rating.

Another positive review came from IGN writer Roth Cornet, who gave the episode a 9.5/10 "amazing" rating.

References

External links 
 

2014 American television episodes
Fargo (TV series) episodes
Television episodes directed by Matt Shakman
Television episodes written by Noah Hawley